Bread crumbs or breadcrumbs (regional variants including breading and crispies) consist of crumbled bread of various dryness, sometimes with seasonings added, used for breading or crumbing foods, topping casseroles, stuffing poultry, thickening stews, adding inexpensive bulk to soups, meatloaves and similar foods, and making a crisp and crunchy covering for fried foods, especially breaded cutlets like tonkatsu and schnitzel.  The Japanese variety of bread crumbs is called panko.

Types

Dry
Dry breadcrumbs are made from dry breads which have been baked or toasted to remove most remaining moisture, and may have a sandy or even powdery texture.  Bread crumbs are most easily produced by pulverizing slices of bread in a food processor, using a steel blade to make coarse crumbs, or a grating blade to make fine crumbs. A grater or similar tool will also do.

Fresh
The breads used to make soft or fresh bread crumbs are not quite as dry, so the crumbs are larger and produce a softer coating, crust, or stuffing. The crumb of bread crumb also refers to the texture of the soft, inner part of a bread loaf, as distinguished from the crust, or "skin".

Panko

 is a type of flaky bread crumbs used in Japanese cuisine as a crunchy coating for fried foods, such as tonkatsu. Panko is made from bread baked by electrical current, which yields a bread without a crust, and then grinding the bread to create fine slivers of crumb.  It has a crisper, airier texture than most types of breading found in Western cuisine and maintains its texture baked or deep fried, resulting in a lighter coating. Outside Japan, its use has become more common in both Asian and non-Asian dishes. It is often used on seafood and is typically available in Asian markets, speciality stores, and many large supermarkets.

Panko is produced worldwide, particularly in Asian countries, including Japan, Korea, Malaysia, Thailand, China, and Vietnam.

Etymology 

The Japanese first learned to make bread from Europeans. The word パン粉 (panko) is derived from pan, giving us the word for bread in Japanese (derived from the Portuguese word "pão" for bread), and -粉 (-ko), a Japanese Kanji indicating "flour", "coating", "crumb", or "powder" on occasion, when used as a suffix; (as in komeko, "rice powder", sobako, "buckwheat flour", and komugiko, "wheat flour").

Breading

Breading (also known as crumbing) is a dry grain-derived food coating for a piece of food made from bread crumbs or a breading mixture with seasonings. Breading is well suited for frying as it lends itself to creating a crisp coating around the food. Breading mixtures can be made of breadcrumb, flour, cornmeal, and seasoning that the item to be breaded is dredged in before cooking. If the item to be breaded is too dry for the coating to stick, the item may first be moistened with buttermilk, raw egg, egg wash or other liquid.

Breading contrasts with batter, which is a grain-based liquid coating for food that produces a smoother and finer texture, but which can be softer overall.

In popular culture
In the fairy tale "Hansel and Gretel", breadcrumbs are used by Hansel and Gretel to track their footpath. However, the bread crumbs were eventually eaten by birds, subsequently leading them to become lost in the woods. The popularity of breadcrumbs in the fairy tale led to the use of the word "breadcrumb" as a navigation element that allows users to keep track of their locations within programs or documents.

Gallery

References

Food ingredients
Crumbs
Food industry